Pierre Haïk (9 August 1950 – 19 February 2023) was a French lawyer. He defended high-profile politicians, such as Nicolas Sarkozy, Serge Dassault and Charles Pasqua.

Biography
Born in Tlemcen, French Algeria, on 9 August 1950, Haïk began his career in law, working on cases of robbery and gang violence. He began a partnership with Thierry Herzog. He focused particularly on the Gang des postiches cases and the UBS robberies.

In 1984, Haïk met Jacqueline Laffont, whom he later married. According to GQ, the two were among "the most powerful lawyers in France". In the late 1990s, he had numerous politicians as clients, including former Minister of the Interior Charles Pasqua, former President of Ivory Coast Laurent Gbagbo, the spouse of the Mayor of Paris Xavière Tiberi, and former chief executive of Vivendi, Jean-Marie Messier.

In the 2000s, Haïk defended the businessman Arcadi Gaydamak in the Mitterrand–Pasqua affair. The couple defended  in the Bettencourt affair, as well as Serge Dassault and Alexandre Benalla.

Due to Alzheimer's disease, Haïk began ending his activities in 2019. In 2020, his wife took over Sarkozy's case in the Bismuth affair. He died on 19 February 2023, at age 72.

Distinctions
 Knight of the Legion of Honour (2009)

References

1950 births
2023 deaths
Pieds-Noirs
20th-century French lawyers
21st-century French lawyers
People from Tlemcen
Chevaliers of the Légion d'honneur